Belsk Duży  is a village in Grójec County, Masovian Voivodeship, in east-central Poland. It is the seat of the gmina (administrative district) called Gmina Belsk Duży.

The village has a population of 800.

Notable people
 Jan Rządkowski, Polish general

References

Villages in Grójec County
Warsaw Voivodeship (1919–1939)